Viscount  was a Japanese politician and diplomat who served as Foreign Minister during the Meiji era.

Biography
Aoki was born to a samurai family as the son of the domain physician of Chōshū, in what is now part of San'yō-Onoda in Yamaguchi Prefecture. He studied western science and medicine (rangaku) at the domain school Meirinkan in Hagi, and in Nagasaki, He was then sent to Germany by the Chōshū Domain to study western law in 1868. However, while in Germany, his studies ranged over a very wide area, from western medicine, to politics, military science, and economics. From his surviving notes, he studied how to make beer, paper and paper money, carpets and rugs and techniques of western forestry management.

Aoki returned to Japan after the Meiji Restoration, and entered the Foreign Ministry of the new Meiji government in 1873, as First Secretary to the Japanese legations to Germany, Netherlands and Austria-Hungary. He then served as Vice Foreign Minister in the first Itō administration and Foreign Minister in the first Yamagata administration. While Foreign Minister, he strove for the revision the unequal treaties between the Empire of Japan and the various European powers, particularly the extraterritoriality clauses, and expressed concern over the eastern expansion of the Russian Empire into east Asia.

During this time, Viscount Aoki was instrumental in the development of the internal program for Transfers of technology and advice on systems and cultural ways.

By the hand of Aoki, over a dozen of specialized western professionals were brought to Japan in 1887, not only at a governmental level but also into the private sector. Amongst these so called "O-yatoi gaikokujin" were prominent figures including W. K. Burton, Ottmar von Mohl, Albert Favre Zanuti, Henry Spencer Palmer, Hermann Ende, Wilhelm Böckmann, Rudolf Dittrich and Ludwig Riess.

In 1888 Aoki commissioned an architect and friend from Berlin times, Matsugasaki Tsumunaga, to build him a villa as resort in Nasu highlands. This villa was costly restored in recent years and entered the list of Important Cultural Properties of Japan. Matsugasaki won Aoki as first president of the newly established Society of Japanese Architects in 1888.

Aoki was forced to resign as a consequence of the Ōtsu Incident of 1891, but resumed his post as Foreign Minister under the Matsukata administration.

In 1894, as ambassador to Great Britain, Aoki worked with Foreign Minister Mutsu Munemitsu towards the revision of the unequal treaties, successfully concluding the Anglo-Japanese Treaty of Commerce and Navigation for Japan in London on 16 July 1894.

Returned to his post as Foreign Minister under the second Yamagata administration, Aoki helped Japan gain recognition as one of the Great Powers by its military support of the European forces during the Boxer Rebellion.

Aoki was then appointed to the Privy Council and elevated in title to shishaku (viscount).

In 1906, he served as ambassador to the United States. In 1908, Aoki protested to President Theodore Roosevelt to stop racial hostility against Japanese immigrants in California, There were anti-Asian groups and bills that discriminated against the Japanese, which included segregation of Japanese children in schools. Californians did not want Japanese immigrants to dominate the state's agricultural economy, as the Japanese bought their own land and refused to work for white Californians. Aoki negotiated with Roosevelt and reached an agreement to restrict passports, deport some Japanese, and withdraw anti-alien bills. Although this did not stop the immigration of the Japanese or future discriminatory legislation, it did reduce diplomatic hostility.

Aoki died at his country house in Nasu, Tochigi prefecture in 1914.

Family

Aoki married on 20 April 1877 in Bremen the daughter of a Prussian aristocrat, Elisabeth von Rhade (13 January 1849, Strippow, Pomerania, Prussia, Germany – 5 April 1931, Munich, Bavaria, Germany), and they had a daughter Viscountess Aoki Hanna (Japanese named Hanako) (6 December 1879, Tokyo – 24 June 1953, Wissen, Rhineland-Palatinate, West Germany), who married in Tokyo, 19 December 1904 Alexander Maria Hermann Melchior, Graf von Hatzfeldt zu Trachenberg (10 February 1877, Berlin, Brandenburg, Prussia, Germany – 27 November 1953, Schloss Schönstein, Schönstein, Rhineland-Palatinate, West Germany). Alexander and Hanna had an only daughter, Hissa Elisabeth Natalie Olga Ilsa Gräfin von Hatzfeldt zu Trachenberg (26 February 1906, Pommerswitz, Silesia, Prussia, Germany – 4 June 1985, Salzburg, Salzburg, Austria), who married in Munich, 28 April 1927 Maria Erwin Joseph Sidonius Benediktus Franziskus von Sales Petrus Friedrich Ignatius Hubertus Johannes von Nepomuk Felix Maurus Graf von Neipperg (15 January 1897, Schwaigern, Baden, Germany – 5 December 1957, Stuttgart-Vaihingen, Baden-Württemberg, West Germany), a great-grandson of Austrian general Adam Albert von Neipperg. Erwin and Hissa had four children, but now extinct in male line. Hissa's daughter Maria Hedwig Gabrielle Nathalie Benedicta Lioba Laurentia Gräfin von Neipperg (born 10 August 1929) married Sir Anthony Williams, a British ambassador to Argentina during Falkland War.

Morihisa Aoki (born 23 November 1938), Japanese ambassador to Peru during the Japanese embassy hostage crisis was his great-grandson.

Awards and decorations

Japanese

Peerages and titles
 Viscount (7 May 1887)

Decorations
 Grand Cordon of the Order of the Sacred Treasure (30 June 1890)
 Grand Cordon of the Order of the Rising Sun (29 August 1894)
 Grand Cordon of the Order of the Paulownia Flowers (16 February 1914; posthumous)

Order of precedence
 Third rank (20 October 1886)
 Senior second rank (16 February 1914; posthumous)

Foreign
  German Empire:
 Grand Cross of the Red Eagle (26 January 1895; Knight 1st Class: 25 December 1885); in Brilliants (18 June 1897)
  Mecklenburg: Grand Cross of the Griffon (26 December 1885)
  Saxe-Coburg-Gotha: Grand Cross of the Saxe-Ernestine House Order (25 December 1885)
  Kingdom of Bavaria: Order of St. Michael, Knight 1st Class (17 August 1895)
  Kingdom of Portugal: Grand Cross of the Order of Christ  (27 September 1887)
  Siam: Knight Grand Cross of the Crown (21 February 1888)
  Ottoman Empire: Order of the Medjidie, 1st Class (27 May 1891)
  Denmark: Grand Cross of the Dannebrog (22 July 1902)

See also
 List of Japanese ministers, envoys and ambassadors to Germany

References

Further reading
 Okada, Y.: Aoki Shūzō Nasu bessō. (The country house of Aoki Shūzō at Nasu) 1995
 Auslin, Michael R. (2004).   Negotiating with Imperialism: The Unequal Treaties and the Culture of Japanese Diplomacy. Cambridge: Harvard University Press. ; OCLC 56493769
 Edström, Bert. Turning Points in Japanese History. RoutledgeCurzon (2002). 
 Jansen, Marius B.  (2000). The Making of Modern Japan. Cambridge: Harvard University Press. ; OCLC 44090600
 Nussbaum, Louis-Frédéric and Käthe Roth. (2005).  Japan encyclopedia. Cambridge: Harvard University Press. ; OCLC 58053128

External links

 National Diet Library biography & photo 
 The O-Yatoi Gaikokujin during the Meiji Era
 Foreign government advisors in Meiji Japan

1844 births
1914 deaths
Kazoku
People from Yamaguchi Prefecture
Ambassadors of Japan to Austria-Hungary
Ambassadors of Japan to Germany
Ambassadors of Japan to the United Kingdom
Ambassadors of Japan to the United States

People of Meiji-period Japan
Foreign ministers of Japan
Recipients of the Order of the Rising Sun with Paulownia Flowers
Grand Crosses of the Order of the Dannebrog
Recipients of the Order of the Medjidie, 1st class
Grand Crosses of the Order of Christ (Portugal)